Expedition 55 was the 55th expedition to the International Space Station, which began upon the departure of Soyuz MS-06 on February 27, 2018. Anton Shkaplerov, Scott D. Tingle and Norishige Kanai were transferred from Expedition 54, with Anton Shkaplerov taking the commander role. Expedition 55 ended upon the departure of Soyuz MS-07 in June 2018.

Crew

Spacewalks

Uncrewed spaceflights to the ISS
Resupply missions that visited the International Space Station during Expedition 55:

References

Expeditions to the International Space Station
2018 in spaceflight